Lorna Simpson (born August 13, 1960) is an American photographer and multimedia artist. She came to prominence in the 1980s and 1990s with artworks such as Guarded Conditions and Square Deal. Simpson is most well known for her work in conceptual photography. Her works have been included in numerous exhibitions both nationally and internationally. She is best known for her photo-text installations, photo-collages, and films. Her early work raised questions about the nature of representation, identity, gender, race and history. Simpson continues to explore these themes in relation to memory and history in various media including photography, film, video, painting, drawing, audio, and sculpture.

Early life
Lorna Simpson was born on August 13, 1960, and grew up in Crown Heights, a neighborhood in Brooklyn, New York. She attended the High School of Art and Design. Her parents – a Jamaican-Cuban father and African-American mother – moved from the Midwest to New York and took her to numerous plays, museums, concerts and dance performances as a child. In the summers, Simpson took courses at the Art Institute of Chicago while visiting her grandmother.

Education 
Prior to receiving her BFA, Simpson traveled to Europe, Africa, and the United States where she further developed her skills through documentary photography. While traveling, she became inspired to expand her work beyond the field of photography to challenge and engage the viewer. It is then that she expanded her art practice to graphic design. Simpson later attended the School of Visual Arts in New York City where she received a Bachelor of Fine Arts in Painting in 1982. During that time, she interned at the Studio Museum in Harlem, acquainting herself with the practice of David Hammons, among others, who was an artist in residence.

While earning her Master of Fine Arts degree in visual arts, from the University of California at San Diego in 1985, Simpson further expanded her ideas. Her education in San Diego was somewhere between Photography and Conceptual art, and her teachers included conceptual artist Allan Kaprow, performance artist Eleanor Antin, filmmakers Babette Mangolte, Jean-Pierre Gorin and poet David Antin. What emerged was her signature style of "photo-text". In these photos Simpson inserted graphic text into studio-like portraiture. In doing so, Simpson brought an entirely new conceptual meaning to the works. This new perspective and style of Simpson derived from her curiosity about whether or not documentary photography was factual or served as a constructed truth generated by documentary photographer themselves. These works generally related to analyzing and critiquing stereotypical narratives pertaining to gender and race of African-American women within American culture.

Career 
In her work in the 1980s and 1990s, she tries to portray African-American women in a way that is neither derogatory nor actual representations of the women portrayed. Some artists that have influenced her work include David Hammons, Adrian Piper, and Felix-Gonzalex Torres; and even some writers like Ishmael Reed, Langston Hughes, Ntozake Shange, Alice Walker, and Toni Morrison because of their rhythmical voice. She was awarded a National Endowment for the Arts Fellowship in 1985, and in 1990, she became the first African-American woman to exhibit at the Venice Biennale. She was also the first African American woman to have a solo exhibition in the Museum of Modern Art with her Projects 23 exhibition. In 1990, Simpson had one woman exhibitions at several major museums, including the Denver Art Museum, Denver, Colorado, the Portland Art Museum, Portland, Oregon, and the Museum of Modern Art, New York. At the same time, her work was included in The Decade Show: Frameworks of Identity in the 1980s, an exhibition presented by The Museum of Contemporary Hispanic Art, The New Museum of Contemporary Art, and The Studio Museum in Harlem. Simpson has explored various media and techniques, including two-dimensional photographs as well as silk screening her photographs on large felt panels, creating installations, or producing as video works such as Call Waiting (1997).

The figure slowly started to disappear from Simpson's work around the end of 1992, when her focus turned to aesthetic issues. Her interest in the human body remained during this time however she was trying to work through these issues without the image of the figure. In 1997, Simpson received the Artist-in-Residence grant from the Wexner Center for the Arts in Columbus, Ohio, where she exhibited her works in photography. By the 2000s, she had started exploring the medium of video installations to avoid a paralysis brought on by outside expectations. In 2001, she was awarded the Whitney Museum of Art Award, and in 2007, her work was featured in a 20-year retrospective at the Whitney Museum of American Art in her hometown of New York City.

Simpson's work has been displayed at the Museum of Modern Art, the Museum of Contemporary Art, the Miami Art Museum, the Walker Art Center, the Minneapolis Institute of Art, and the Irish Museum of Modern Art, the Whitney and the Studio Museum in Harlem, The Whitney Museum of American Art and the Venice Biennale, where she was the first African American to participate. Her first European retrospective opened at the Jeu de Paume in Paris in 2013, then traveled to Germany, England, and Massachusetts. She has also been one of a handful of African-American artists to exhibit at the Jamaica Arts Center in Queens, New York and then to the gallery in Soho.

She first exhibited paintings in 2015 at the 56th Venice Biennale, followed by a showing at the Salon 94 Bowery.

In 2016 Simpson created the album artwork for Black America Again by Common. During the same year, she was featured in the book In the Company of Women, Inspiration and Advice from over 100 Makers, Artists, and Entrepreneurs. In a 2017 issue of Vogue Magazine, Simpson showcased a series of portraits of 18 professional creative women who hold art central to their lives. The women photographed included Teresita Fernández, Huma Bhabha, and Jacqueline Woodson. Inspired by their resilience, Simpson said of these women, "They don't take no for an answer".

While she first built her career upon being a conceptual photographer, she has since explored various media including video, installation, drawing, painting and film into her pieces. Simpson's goal is to continue to influence the legacy of black artists today by speaking with artists and activists such as the Art Hoe Collective. When asked about her career Simpson says, "I've always done exactly what I wanted to do, regardless of what was out there. I just stuck to that principle and I'm a much happier person as a result. And I can't imagine trying to satisfy any particular audience".

Simpson's work is included in the Afrofuturist Period Room exhibition Before Yesterday We Could Fly at the Metropolitan Museum of Art.

Simpson's work was included in the 2022 exhibition Women Painting Women at the Modern Art Museum of Fort Worth.

Work

Simpson first came to prominence in the 1980s for her large-scale works that combined photography and text and defied traditional conceptions of sex, identity, race, culture, history, and memory. Primarily, Simpson is interested in exploring individual identities in her work and the intersectionality of identities. She is well known for her exploration of the black female identity, though she is also interested in all identities, in the American identity, in universal figures, and universality. Simpson is also interested in ambiguity in her work, she includes "gaps and contradictions so that not all the viewer's questions are answered." Simpson's ambiguity often allows viewers to think, to take in her work and the larger questions that her work raises. Simpson's "high level of conceptional sophistication and social awareness" has gained her much positive attention, as has her attention and use of political issues in her work. Simpson has "seized on conceptualism's signature tropes-the grid, seriality, repletion, and, above all, language-to examine how our knowledge of the world comes to be organized." Repetition of figures in "minimalist photographs" and text creates a "interplay of text and images" that  "relies on repetition to make clear the difference that racialization makes." Drawing on this work, she started to create large photos printed on felt that showed public but unnoticed sexual encounters. Recently, Simpson has experimented with film as well as continuing to work with photography. Simpson's "interests in photography [has] always been paralleled by an interest in film, particularly in the way that one structurally builds sequences in film." Simpson began working in film in 1997 with her work Call Waiting and has continued such work in subsequent years.

Simpson's 1989 work, Necklines, shows two circular and identical photographs of a black woman's mouth, chin, neck, and collar bone. The white text, "ring, surround, lasso, noose, eye, areola, halo, cuffs, collar, loop", individual words on black plaques, imply menace, binding or worse. The final phrase, text on red "feel the ground sliding from under you," openly suggests lynching, though the adjacent images remain serene, non-confrontational and elegant.

Easy for Who to Say, Simpson's work from 1989, displays five identical silhouettes of black women from the shoulders up wearing a white top that is similar to women portrayed in other of Simpson's works. The women's faces are obscured by a white-colored oval shape each with one of the following letters inside: A, E, I, O, U. Underneath the corresponding portraits are the words: Amnesia, Error, Indifference, Omission, Uncivil. In this work Simpson alludes to the racialization in ethnographic cinema and the revocation of history faced by many people of color. Also, the letters covering the faces suggest "intimate multiplicity of positions she might occupy and attitudes she might assume-", these potential thoughts are stopped, abruptly, by the words, "undermining not only the subjective position the figure would seek but also her grasp on any recognizable position at all."

Simpson's work Guarded Conditions, created in 1989, was one in a series in which Simpson has assembled fragmented Polaroid images of a female model whom she has regularly collaborated with. The body is fragmented and viewed from behind, while the back of the model's head is sensed as being in a state of guardedness towards possible hostility she can anticipate as a result of the combination of her sex and the color of her skin. The complex historical and symbolic associations of African-American hairstyles are also brought into play. The message of the text and the formal treatment of the image reinforce a sense of vulnerability. One can also note that the figures, though in similar poses, differ slightly in the placement of the figure's feet, hair, and hands. These subtle differences might suggest, "the model's shifting relationship to herself." The fragmentation and serialization of bodily images disrupts and denies the body's wholeness and individuality. In attempting to read the work the viewer is provoked into confronting histories of appropriation and consumption of the black female body. Many critics associate this work with the slave auction, as a reminder that black "enslaved women were removed from the circle of human suffering so that they might become circulating objects of sexual and pecuniary exchange." These women had no choice but to stand on the auction block and put themselves, their bodies, on display for sell. They become objects, a subject that Simpson often makes the focus of her work.

Simpson also incorporated the complicated relationship that African American women have with their natural hair in her work Wigs (1994). The assortment of wigs ranges from afros, braids and blonde locks of human, yak and synthetic hair mounted side by side. Simpson's Wigs (1994) does not include any figures, instead the line up wigs suggest scientific specimens. Simpson explains in an interview on Wigs (1994) “This work came at a point where I wanted to eliminate the figure from—or eliminate its presence from the work, but I still wanted to talk about that presence.”  According to the Museum of Modern Art, Learning page, the work has various social and political undertones about the surrounding culture and the beauty standards that the culture produces. As such, the work forces the viewer to question why such beauty standards exists and how they are perpetuated by society. Though Simpson's work often centered around issues of personal memory, it was not until 2009 that Simpson introduced self-portraiture into her body of work. Her series 1957–2009 included vintage black and white photographs depicting "found pinup-style images of a young African American women" from 1957, juxtaposed against self-portraits in which Simpson reproduced the backdrop and the model's pose in the context of the present day. Simpson thus recreated a narrative of beauty ideals that excluded black women in the 1950s.

In 2009, Simpson created a piece called May, June, July, August '57/'09 #8. In this work, Simpson combined photographs of herself alongside a series of photos that she acquired through eBay. The photos she had bought off eBay were of an unidentified woman, and occasionally a male, in staged and attractive poses. When she received the photos, she hung them on her wall where they stayed for months. Eventually, she decided to recreate the images by taking photos of herself in the same pose and clothing as the woman in the photos in 2009.

Simpson's work often portrays black women combined with text to express contemporary society's relationship with race, ethnicity and sex. In many of her works, the subjects are black women with obscured faces, causing a denial of gaze and the interaction associated with visual exchange. Simpson's use of "turned-back figures" was used to not only "refuse the gaze" but to also "to deny any presumed access to the sitter's personality, and to refute both the classificatory drives and emotional projections typically satisfied by photographic portraiture of black subjects." It has also been suggested that these figures "stand for a generation's mode of looking and questioning photographic representation" Through repetitive use of the same portrait combined with graphic text, her "anti-portraits" have a sense of scientific classification, addressing the cultural associations of black bodies. 

In a 2003 video installation, Corridor, Simpson sets two women side-by-side; a household servant from 1860 and a wealthy homeowner from 1960. Both women are portrayed by artist Wangechi Mutu, allowing parallel and haunting relationships to be drawn. She has commented, "I do not appear in any of my work. I think maybe there are elements to it and moments to it that I use from my own personal experience, but that, in and of itself, is not so important as what the work is trying to say about either the way we interpret experience or the way we interpret things about identity."

Simpson's interest in using audio elements in her works to add "layering" helps to set the tone and mood of a composition. In Corridor music is used to create "an interesting melding visually of two time periods." The music is sometimes lulling and others sharp, terrifying, and haunting, which correlates with the narrative. Simpson often uses "open-ended narratives" in photography and film because she is interested in "insinuating things", she does this in Corridor, where "nothing really happens, it's just a woman going kind of day-to-day, what she does over the course of a day." A "texture" begins to appear that begins to tell viewers what might be going on, it begins to make viewers question "what's missing from the picture" and "what [‘s] trying to [be] conveyed." All of these questions begin to create a setting, a  "time frame" or "period of time" to encourage a viewer to create or imagine or figure out a narrative, to figure out  "these people lives during a particular period of time that is important politically." The viewer can then digest that political environment in present day, they can find associations with their own political climate. In the case of Corridor, the women's day-to-day life, and the mood of the video, dark and lonely, are more similar that one might expect. In this case, Simpson is considering identity again while also considering the past and the effect of the past on the present. Simpson is exploring race and class, the work attempts "to explore American identity and constructions of race."

From 2009 until 2018, Simpson shared a four-story studio with her then-husband James Casebere; the building was David Adjaye's first completed project in the US. In 2014, she spent a three-week residency at collector Pamela Joyner's Sonoma, California, estate. In 2018, she moved into a new studio at the Brooklyn Navy Yard.

Starting from 2016, Lorna Simpson started to include series into her work. In 2016 she published a gradient series that displayed ink and screen print on claybord with various small drawing in black and white. In 2016–2017 she had a head on ice series. These pieces were on ink and screen print on gessoed fiberglass. This artwork was also in black and white, with a few in black, white, and blue to represent the ice. The artwork displayed women of color who were depicted in black or blue and their heads were emphasized in each photograph. From 2017 to 2018, she did an ice series. There is a common theme of blue, white, and black as her main colors of expression so far. In 2018 a montage series. In 2019, she did another ice series along with a special character series. From 2016 to 2019 she developed a large figurative series. This series includes many interactions of women with different levels of expression. It still holds the same theme of blue, black, and white.

One of these most recent series of hers that was created in 2019 is called Special Character series. In this series, Lorna Simpson uses photographic collages to challenge race and gender stereotypes. Special Character 1, Special Character 2, and Special Character 5 in this series consists of Black women who are shimmering in beautiful shades of red, yellow, blue, and black. They are boldly present and their gazes are strong and fierce. Special Character #1 depicts a bisected woman, surrounded by a cloud of yellow color, capturing the viewers with her threefold gaze. Special Character #2 consists of a superimposed woman who is enclosed or enraptured in a cube of sapphire-like ice. Simpson's work in this series delivers a strong message against racism and sexism.

Personal life
Simpson currently lives and works in Brooklyn. From 2007 until 2018, she was married to fellow artist James Casebere. They have a daughter, Zora Casebere, an artist and Instagram personality.

Recognition
 1985 – National Endowment for the Arts Fellowship, United States
 1987 – Workspace Grant, Jamaica Arts Center
 1989 – Artists Space board of directors, New York, NY
 1990 – Louis Comfort Tiffany Award, Louis Comfort Tiffany Foundation, New York, NY
 1994 – Artist Award for a Distinguished Body of Work, College Art Association, New York, NY 
 1997 – Artist-in-Residence Grant, Wexner Center for the Arts, Columbus, OH
 1998 – Finalist, Hugo Boss Prize 1998, Solomon R. Guggenheim Foundation, New York, NY
 2001 – Whitney Museum of American Art Award, sponsored by Cartier and the Cartier Foundation for Contemporary Art, New York, NY
 2003 – Distinguished Artist-In-Residence, Christian A. Johnson Endeavor Foundation, Colgate University, Hamilton, NY
 2014 – Shortlisted, Deutsche Börse Photography Prize
 2018 – SMFA Medal Award, School of the Museum of Fine Arts at Tufts Awardee, Boston, MA
 2019 – Winner, J. Paul Getty Medal (along with Mary Beard and Ed Ruscha)

List of works 
 Stereo Styles. 1988. ten instant film pictures placed on engraved plastic. private collection.
 Back. 1991. 2 colour Polaroids and 3 plastic plaques.
 Counting. 1991. photogravure and screenprint. Minneapolis Institute of Art.
 Five Day Forecast. 1991. 5 photographs, gelatin silver print on paper and 15 engraved plaques. Tate Modern, London.
 Untitled (What should fit here...). 1993. photo-etching, screenprint and hand-applied watercolor. Minneapolis Institute of Art.
 lll (Three Wishbones in a Wood Box). 1994. wooden box containing three wishbones made of ceramic, rubber and bronze inserted in two felt pads. Minneapolis Institute of Art.
 The Waterbearer. 1996. silver print.
 Wigs (Portfolio). 1994. portfolio of twenty-one lithographs on felt with seventeen lithographed felt text panels. Museum of Modern Art, New York City.
Gestures/Reenactments. 1985. 6 photographs of a black man in white clothes, with text captions underneath.

Selected solo exhibitions 
 Lorna Simpson: Projects 23, Museum of Modern Art, New York, 1990  
 Lorna Simpson, For the Sake of the Viewer, Museum of Contemporary Art Chicago; Contemporary Art Museum Honolulu; Contemporary Arts Center, Cincinnati; Henry Art Gallery, University of Washington. Seattle; Studio Museum in Harlem, New York, 1992–1994 
 Lorna Simpson: Recent Work, John Berggruen Galley, San Francisco, 1993 
 Works by Lorna Simpson, Contemporary Arts Museum Houston, 1993  
 Wigs, Museum of Photographic Arts, San Diego, 1994  
 Lorna Simpson: New Works, Rhono Hoffman Gallery, Chicago, 1994  
 Standing in the Water, Whitney Museum of American Art at Phillip Morris, New York; Fabric Workshop, Philadelphia, 1994  
 Lorna Simpson: Wigs, Albrecht Kemper Museum of Art, Saint Joseph, MO, 1996 
 Lorna Simpson: New Work Series, Miami Art Museum, 1997  
 Lorna Simpson: Interior/Exterior, Full/Empty, Wexner Center for the Arts, Ohio State University, Columbus, 1997–1998  
 Lorna Simpson: Call Waiting, Art Gallery of Ontario, Toronto, 1998  
 Scenarios: Recent Works by Lorna Simpson, Addison Gallery of American Art, Andover, MA; Walker Art Center, Minneapolis; University of Michigan Museum of Art, Ann Arbor; National Museum of Women in the Arts, Washington, DC; Sean Kelly Gallery, New York, 1991–2001 
 CCA Kitakyushu Project Gallery, Kitakyushu, Japan, 2000 
 Lorna Simpson: Easy to Remember, Weatherspoon Art Museum, University of North Carolina, Greensboro, 2002 
 Lorna Simpson: Cameos and Appearances, Whitney Museum of American Art, 2002
 Consejo Nacional Para la Cultura y las Artes, Mexico City, 2003 
 Compostela: Lorna Simpson, Centro Galego de Arte Contemporanea, Santiago de Compostela, Spain, 2004  
 Lorna Simpson, Corridor, Wohnmaschine, Berlin, 2004   
 Lorna Simpson: 31, Prefix Institute of Contemporary Art, Toronto, 2005
 Lorna Simpson, organized by American Federation of the Arts; Museum of Contemporary Art, Los Angeles; Miami Art Museum; Whitney Museum of American Art, New York; Kalamazoo Institute of Art, Kalamazoo, MI; Gibbes Museum, Charleston, SC, 2006–2007
 30 Americans, the Rubell Family Collection, Miami, North Carolina Museum of Art, Corcoran Gallery of Art, Chrysler Museum of Art, Milwaukee Art Museum, Frist Center for the Visual Arts, Contemporary Arts Center (New Orleans), Arkansas Arts Center, Detroit Institute of Arts, Cincinnati Art Museum, and Tacoma Art Museum, 2008.
 Lorna Simpson: Momentum, Salon 94 Bowery, New York, 2011.
 Lorna Simpson: Gathered, The Elizabeth A. Sackler Center for Feminist Art at the Brooklyn Museum, 2011.
 Lorna Simpson, organized by the Foundation for the Exhibition of Photography, Minneapolis and Lausanne, Switzerland; Galerie nationale du Jeu de Paume, Paris; Haus der Kunst, Munich; Addison Gallery of American Art, Andover, MA, 2013 (The first European retrospective of Simpson's work in 2013, which traveled to the Baltic Centre for Contemporary Art in 2014).
 Focus: Lorna Simpson, Modern Art Museum of Fort Worth, Fort Worth, TX, 2016.
 Lorna Simpson: Hypothetical? Fisher Landau Center for Art, Long Island City, NY, 2017.
 Lorna Simpson: from the Collections of Jordan D. Schnitzer, Embodied series, Blue Sky Gallery, Portland, OR, 2017.
Lorna Simpson: Summertime, The Underground Museum, Los Angeles, CA, 2019.
 Lorna Simpson. Darkening, Hauser & Wirth, New York, NY, 2019.
Give Me Some Moments following 2019 exhibition Darkening at Hauser & Wirth, online, 2020.
 Lorna Simpson. Standing in the Water, The Fabric Workshop and Museum, Philadelphia, PA, 2020.

Publications
 Simon, Joan. "Lorna Simpson." New York: Prestel Publishing, 2013. Print.
 
 
 
 
 
 
 .

References

Further reading
 Brockington, Horace. "Logical Anonymity: Lorna Simpson, Steve McQueen, Stan Douglas." International Review of African American Art 15 No. 3 (1998): 20–29.
 Simpson, Lorna; Rogers, Sarah J.  Lorna Simpson: Interior/Exterior, Full/Empty, Wexner Center for the Visual Arts 1998,

External links
 Lorna Simpson - Official website
 Lorna Simpson on MoMA Learning
 Lorna Simpson on artnet
 Lorna Simpson – Exhibitions listed on kunstaspekte
 Lorna Simpson in the Minneapolis Institute of Art, Minneapolis, MN
 Joint show Nothing Personal at the Art Institute of Chicago with Zoe Leonard and Cindy Sherman
 Getty video "On artist Lorna Simpson, Recipient of the 2019 Getty Medal"
Lorna Simpson on the African American Visual Artists Database

1960 births
Living people
African-American photographers
African-American contemporary artists
American contemporary artists
American women printmakers
People from Brooklyn
High School of Art and Design alumni
20th-century American printmakers
20th-century American photographers
21st-century American photographers
20th-century American women photographers
21st-century American women photographers
African-American printmakers
20th-century African-American women
20th-century African-American people
20th-century African-American artists
21st-century African-American women